Hubert Joseph Walthère Frère-Orban (24 April 1812 – 2 January 1896) was a Belgian liberal statesman.

Early life
He was born at Liège, received his education at home and in Paris, and began the practice of law in his native town. He identified himself with the Liberal party, and was conspicuous in the controversy with the Catholic clergy.

Career
In 1846, he wrote the program, which was accepted as the charter for a liberal political party. In 1847 he was elected to the Belgian Chamber and appointed Minister of Public Works. and from 1848 to 1852 he held the portfolio of Finance.  He founded the national bank of Belgium, reduced postage, abolished the newspaper tax and was a strong advocate of free trade.

His work,  (1854–57), directed against the Conservatives, produced a great effect on the position of parties in Belgium. As a result, in 1857, the Liberals returned to power and Frère-Orban became once more minister of Finance in the cabinet of Charles Rogier, whom he succeeded to become the prime minister in 1868. In 1870 the Catholics regained their supremacy and forced him to retire, but from 1878 to 1884 he was again at the head of the cabinet, most notably breaking off diplomatic relations with the Papal States in 1880 (which were restored in 1884).

Standing as a liberal again in the October 1894 elections, he categorically refused the support of Catholics against progressives and socialists. He was not re-elected, defeated by the socialist Célestin Demblon.

Weakened by illness, he died on 2 January 1896. Frère-Orban lies in its birthplace, Liège, in the cemetery of Robermont.

Political philosophy
Frère-Orban's liberalism consisted in the assertion of the authority of the state over the church and the defense of the system of secular public instruction against the clergy. He was at all times opposed to the "undue extension" of suffrage. Among other works he wrote La question monétaire.

Honours 
 National
 :
 Minister of State, by Royal Decree.
 1881: Grand Cordon in the Order of Leopold (civil division).
 Foreign
  Austria-Hungary: 1881: Knight Grand Cross in the Royal Hungarian Order of Saint Stephen.
 : Knight Grand Cross in the Legion of Honour.
  Kingdom of Prussia: 6 May 1852: Knight 1st Class in the Order of the Red Eagle.
: Knight Grand Cross in the Imperial Order of Leopold of Austria
 : Knight Grand Cross in the Order of Charles III.
 : Knight Grand Cross in the Royal Military Order of Our Lord Jesus Christ.
: Knight Grand Cross in the Royal Guelphic Order.
 : Knight Grand Cross in the Order of Saints Maurice and Lazarus.
 : Knight Grand Cross in the Order of the Gold Lion of the House of Nassau.

See also
 ASLK / CGER

References

Sources
Liberal Archive

|-

1812 births
1896 deaths
Belgian Ministers of State
Belgian writers in French
Politicians from Liège
Prime Ministers of Belgium
Walloon people
Finance ministers of Belgium
Flemish nobility
Grand Crosses of the Order of Saint Stephen of Hungary
Knights Grand Cross of the Order of Saints Maurice and Lazarus
Grand Croix of the Légion d'honneur
Grand Crosses of the Order of Christ (Portugal)